HMS Friendship was a 4-gun single-masted cutter of the Royal Navy, purchased in 1763 for coastal patrol duties in the immediate aftermath of the Seven Years' War with France. After eight years service in Start Bay in Devon, she was declared surplus to Navy requirements and sold out of service at Plymouth.

Construction 
Friendship was one of thirty cutters ordered to be purchased by the Royal Navy in a three-month period from December 1762 to February  1763 for coastal duties off English ports. The function of these purchased cutters included convoy and patrol, the carrying of messages between Navy vessels in port and assisting the press gang in the interception of merchant craft.

Admiralty Orders for her purchase were issued on 16 February 1763 with the transaction completed at a price of £316. At the time of purchase she had been at sea as a merchant vessel for three years.

On 8 April 1763 the newly purchased cutter was sailed to Woolwich Dockyard for fitting out as a Navy craft. Works ran for two months until 17 June, at a total cost of £501. As rebuilt for Navy service, she was armed with four three-pounder cannons and six -pounder swivel guns, with a complement of 24 crew.

Naval service
War with France had ended before Friendship was ready for service. Despite this, commissioning went ahead in April 1763 and the vessel entered the Navy as a patrol cutter in Start Bay off Devon. Her first commander was Lieutenant Patrick Strachan, father of future Royal Navy Admiral Sir Richard Strachan. In 1766 command passed to Lieutenant Rowland Pigot, and then in 1768 to Lieutenant John Glover. Friendship remained at the same station throughout these changes of command. In September 1769 she captured a smuggler's vessel carrying two hundred gallons of brandy and a quantity of tea.

Friendship was paid off as surplus to Navy requirements in 1771. On 29 October she was sold out of service at Plymouth Dockyard for a final price of £100.

Notes

Citations

References
 
 

Cutters of the Royal Navy
1760 ships